Bolivar Township, Arkansas may refer to:

 Bolivar Township, Jefferson County, Arkansas
 Bolivar Township, Poinsett County, Arkansas

See also 
 List of townships in Arkansas

Arkansas township disambiguation pages